Burkina Faso–Denmark relations refers to the current and historical relationship between Burkina Faso and Denmark. Burkina Faso has an embassy in Copenhagen, and Denmark has an embassy in Ouagadougou.

Assistance
Burkina Faso has, since 1973, been in a development cooperation with Denmark, and a programme country since 1993. Assistance for Burkina Faso was 233 million DKK in 2010; in 2013, Denmark assisted with 250 million DKK.

Denmark's main support is towards poverty reduction, through the Danish and Burkinabe Development Cooperation. Denmark also has an agriculture programme in Burkina Faso.

Several agreements have been signed between Denmark and Burkina Faso.

See also
 Foreign relations of Burkina Faso
 Foreign relations of Denmark

References

External links 
 Burkina Faso and Denmark Partnership 
 Denmark-Burkina Faso Friendship 
 Association Kologh Naba 

 
Denmark
Bilateral relations of Denmark